was a town in Mitoyo District, Kagawa Prefecture, Japan.

As of 2003, the town had an estimated population of 8,774 and a density of 525.70 persons per km². The total area was 16.69 km².

On October 11, 2005, Toyohama, along with the town of Ōnohara (also from Mitoyo District), was merged to create the city of Kan'onji and no longer exists as an independent municipality.

External links
 Official website of Kan'onji 

Dissolved municipalities of Kagawa Prefecture
Kan'onji, Kagawa